C. vermicularis may refer to:
 Chelonistele vermicularis, an orchid species
 Clavaria vermicularis, the white coral worm, fairy finger, a fungus species
 Coelogyne vermicularis, J.J.Sm., an orchid species in the genus Coelogyne

See also
 Vermicularis (disambiguation)